Holiday Camp is a 1947 British comedy drama film directed by Ken Annakin, starring Flora Robson, Jack Warner, Dennis Price, and Hazel Court, and also features Kathleen Harrison and Jimmy Hanley. It is set at one of the then-popular holiday camps. It resonated with post-war audiences and was very successful. It was the first film to feature the Huggett family, who went on to star in "The Huggetts" film series.

Synopsis
Set in a Butlin's-style holiday camp on the English coast in contemporary post-war Britain, a working class London family have their first visit to a summer holiday camp. It was the first film to feature the Huggett family, who went on to star in "The Huggetts" film series. The film is a kaleidoscope of events involving the Huggetts and others, including a pregnant young girl and her boyfriend, a sailor whose girlfriend has jilted him, a girl looking for a husband, a spinster, a pair of dishonest card sharps, and a murderer on the run. It captures the round of organised leisure activities at the crowded camp and the ever present camp announcements.

As one of the more unusual subplots Esther, a woman holidaying alone and sharing with a stranger Elsie, recognises the voice of the camp announcer, as a former boyfriend. When she eventually finds him, she discovers the correct person, but he was blinded in the First World War. He explains he lost his sight and memory in 1918.

Joan Hugget wins the beauty contest and is immediately targeted by Binky, who appears to be one of the more upper-class campers. He then claims to be an investigator looking for the "Mannequin Murderer" but ultimately proves to be the actual killer.

Harry Hugget loses a lot of money playing cards against two swindlers, ending up owing them more money than he has. However, his dad Joe wins all the money back a few days later.

Cast
Flora Robson as Esther Harman
Dennis Price as Binky Hardwick (aka Jeffrey Baker) an ex-RAF officer
Jack Warner as Joe Huggett
Hazel Court as Joan Martin (née Huggett)
Emrys Jones as Michael Halliday
Kathleen Harrison as Ethel Huggett
Yvonne Owen as Angela Kirby
Esmond Knight as Camp Announcer
Jimmy Hanley as Jimmy Gardner
Peter Hammond as Harry Huggett
Esma Cannon as Elsie Dawson
John Blythe as Steve
Jeannette Tregarthen as Valerie Thompson
Beatrice Varley as Valerie's Aunt
Susan Shaw as Patsy Crawford
Pamela Bramah as Beauty Queen
Alfie Bass as a redcoat
M. E. Clifton James as himself (Monty's Double)
Patricia Roc, Cheerful Charlie Chester, and Gerry Wilmot as themselves (entertaining the campers) and a young Diana Dors dances the Jitterbug.

Development
The film was directed by Ken Annakin, who had made a number of documentaries for producer Sydney Box. When Box took over Gainsborough Pictures he hired Annakin to make Holiday Camp. It was part of Box's initial slate of pictures for the company, others including Jassy and Good Time Girl.

The original story was by magazine writer Godfrey Winn. He went to a Butlin's holiday camp at Filey with Annakin to research. Annakin remembers Winn "put together a very good story" but Sydney and Muriel Box "decided we should add extra elements". He says Muriel Box worked on the Dennis Price character, inspired by the Heath Murders, then they held a round table conference with Ted Willis, Peter Rogers and Mabel Constanduros. "Godfrey wasn't terribly happy about it because he thought he was going to have a single screen credit", says Annakin.

Peter Rogers had worked as Muriel Box's assistant. He says he wrote "the screenplay and most of the stories... but Mabel Constanduros and one or two other people had little ideas. Sydney [Box] was always on the side of writers and always gave writers credit, even if they just had two lines in the script." Rogers claims it was his idea to introduce the Dennis Price character and "the only bit that Mabel Constanduros contributed was the scene between Jack Warner and Kathleen Harrison on the cliffs."

Production
Camp exteriors were shot at Butlin's, Filey. The opening scenes of a train arriving at a seaside cliff-top station and of the passengers boarding buses outside the station were filmed at Sandsend railway station.

Sydney Box used the film to introduce a number of new actors, including Susan Shaw and Hazel Court. It was Diana Dors' second film appearance.

Some brief moments of Warner and Harrison exercising from the film, (and Michael Shepley playing golf), were re-used at the beginning of Into the Blue (1950 film).

Reception

Box office
The film was the sixth most popular movie at the British box office in 1947. According to Kinematograph Weekly the 'biggest winner' at the box office in 1947 Britain was The Courtneys of Curzon Street, with "runners up" being The Jolson Story, Great Expectations, Odd Man Out, Frieda, Holiday Camp and Duel in the Sun.

Annakin attributed this in part "perhaps because I had come from documentary and British cinema at that time was very artificial. The Huggetts absolutely caught the spirit and feeling that existed after the war... People didn't want more fairy stories; they wanted something in which they could recognise themselves. Being of lower-middle-class origins myself, I felt at home with these people who were having a fine holiday in a very cheap place which provided wonderful entertainment. I think I caught the spirit of the holiday camps and we had a very warm, natural cast."

Peter Rogers thought the film was a hit "the same way that the Carry Ons caught on – you've got ordinary people doing amusing things."

The film made a reported profit of £16,000.

Critical
Time Out wrote, "Time has mellowed the documentary quality of the film, and location shooting and authentic detail now seem less important than the presence of the whole range of British acting talent, from Dame Flora Robson to Cheerful Charlie Chester, among the cast of thousands."

"I'm not embarrassed about Holiday Camp", said Annakin years later, "although the later Huggett films don't hold up well."

References

Brian McFarlane, An Autobiography of British Cinema, Methuem Film, 1997

External links
 
Holiday Camp at British Film Institute
Review of film at Variety

1947 films
1947 comedy-drama films
Films about vacationing
Films directed by Ken Annakin
Gainsborough Pictures films
Films produced by Sydney Box
Films with screenplays by Muriel Box
Films with screenplays by Sydney Box
Films with screenplays by Peter Rogers
Films with screenplays by Ted Willis, Baron Willis
British black-and-white films
British comedy-drama films
Films shot in North Yorkshire
The Huggetts (film series)
1947 directorial debut films
1940s English-language films
1940s British films